Christen Roper (born January 14, 1981) is an American former college basketball player at the University of Hawaii, former EuroLeague Women player and former Women's National Basketball Association (WNBA) player.

Christen Roper was a standout high school basketball player at Nordoff High School in Ojai, California. Christen received a basketball scholarship from University of Hawaii and played from 1999 to 2003. In 2003, she was the leader at the University of Hawaii and Western Athletic Conference in career (303) and single-season (110) blocks. Also, she was fourth at University of Hawaii in rebounding (724). She played briefly for the WNBA Sacramento Monarchs and played professional basketball overseas in the EuroLeague for multiple teams.

Career

High school
Christen earned four letters in basketball and three in track and field. She earned all-CIF (California Interscholastic Federation) honors in shot put and discus in her senior season.

College
Christen decided to go to the University of Hawaii. She chose Hawaii over San Diego State, Boise State, Wyoming and Oregon. She graduated from Hawaii with a bachelor's degree in history. She helped lead the Rainbow Wahine to the Women's National Invitation Tournament four out of her four years.

As a captain and in her senior season, she averaged 9.8 points and a team high 7.9 rebounds per game. At the time, she was ranked third in the nation with 3.67 blocks per game. At the end of her career in college, she set the Hawaii and Western Athletic Conference record with 303  career and 110 single-season blocks. She also ranked fourth in all-time rebounding at Hawaii with 724. In her final game as a Rainbow Wahine at Arizona State, Roper set a new WNIT record for most blocks in a game (seven).

Women's National Basketball Association
Christen signed a free-agent contract with the Sacramento Monarchs and made it on the roster in early 2003. Sacramento Monarchs waived her in May.

Overseas
After her brief stint in the WNBA, she played in the EuroLeague Women for the Marburg Marlins, which was one of the top woman's team in Division One of Germany's Federal Basketball League. She averaged 8.3 points and 7.8 rebounds per game.

In 2004, she signed with Panserraikos, a professional Greek team in Serres.

In 2005, she played in the professional Diekirch League in Luxembourg on T-71 Dudelange. The Diekirch League is the highest professional basketball league.

In 2006, Christen played for the Division II Spanish team, Baloncesto de Santa Cruz de Tenerife.

Post career
After multiple injuries, Christen retired in 2007 from professional basketball and moved back to the states. She got a degree of kinesiology in 2008 from Santa Barbara Business College. She then became the Director of Basketball Operations and personal trainer at the Mercer University. In 2009, she decided to move back to California.

She became actively involved in developing basketball talent for post players. She was an integral part of the coaching staff at the Pete Newell Tall Women's Basketball Camp. Also on the staff was Ann Meyers and Bill McClintock.  She has also worked with NBA Centers on their post work at the Pete Newell's Big Man Camp, including the likes of Shawn Bradley and Shaquille O'Neal.

Basketball awards and honors
 Waikiki Beach Marriott Resort Classic Tournament MVP, 2003
 Waikiki Beach Marriott Resort Classic Tournament MVP, 2002
 Hawaii Invitation Co-MVP, 2003
 Ala Moana Hotel Paradise Classic All-Tournament, 2003
 WAC Player of the Week (Dec 28), 2002
 WAC All-Tournament Team, 2002
 All-WAC Academic Team, 2002
 Nike Oregon Trail Summer Tournament MVP, 1997
 Honorable Mention, Street & Smith Preseason All-America, 1998
 3 time Frontier League MVP, 1996-1999
 Named to the All-County Team by the Los Angeles Times, 1998

Personal
Christen Roper was married in 2012 to Kevin Law-Hing. Christen and Kevin have two daughters: Kylie, who was born 2011, and Kayden, born in 2013, as well as a son, Colton, who was born in 2016. Her parents are Bob, a retired Fire Chief of Ventura County, and Debbie. She has a younger sister, Mindy.

References

External links
FIBA Euroleague Profile - Marburg Marlins, Germany
Euroleague Profile, T-71 Dudelange, Luxembourg
Official University of Hawaii Basketball Profile

1981 births
Living people
Basketball players from California
Centers (basketball)